Phytoecia gougeleti is a species of beetle in the family Cerambycidae. It was described by Léon Fairmaire in 1880. It is known from Algeria.

References

Phytoecia
Beetles described in 1880